Kevin Wert (born 10 March 1975) is a Canadian former alpine skier who competed in the 1998 Winter Olympics.

References

1975 births
Living people
Canadian male alpine skiers
Olympic alpine skiers of Canada
Alpine skiers at the 1998 Winter Olympics